Campamento de Verano is a Spanish reality show, based on Big Brother. It aired for one season in 2013.

 2013 (season 1): Campamento de Verano 1 - Winner: José Manuel Montalvo

References 

2013 Spanish television series debuts